Jared DeMichiel (born April 16, 1985) is a former American professional ice hockey goaltender, currently an associate head coach at Michigan State University.

After ending his playing career in 2011, he accepted a position as volunteer goaltending coach for the women's ice hockey team at his alma mater, Rochester Institute of Technology.  In 2012, he was hired as assistant coach for the new Nazareth program.

Awards and honors
Atlantic Hockey First All-Star Team (2009–10)
2010 AHA All-Tournament Team
AHA Regular Season Goaltender of the Year (2009–10)
Louis Spiotti Coaches Award - Player who embodies RIT hockey (2009–10)
Most Outstanding Player in the 2010 NCAA Division I Men's Ice Hockey Tournament
NCAA East Regional Most Outstanding Player (2009–10)
2010 Paychex Male College Athlete of the Year (Rochester Press–Radio Club)

Records
RIT Tigers men's ice hockey Division I record for most wins in a career (41)
RIT Tigers men's ice hockey Division I record for most shutouts in a career (7)

Career statistics

Awards and honours

References

External links

1985 births
Chicago Steel players
Elmira Jackals (ECHL) players
Hershey Bears players
Ice hockey players from Connecticut
Indiana Ice players
Living people
People from Avon, Connecticut
RIT Tigers men's ice hockey players
South Carolina Stingrays players
American men's ice hockey goaltenders